Arnaud Vaissié (born 28 November 1954) is the co-founder, Chairman and CEO of medical and travel security services firm, International SOS. He is also President of CCI France International, a worldwide network of 125 French Chambers of Commerce across 95 countries.

Early life

Arnaud Vaissié was born on 28 November 1954 in Paris, France. He is a graduate from Sciences-Po in Paris.

Career

Arnaud Vaissié started his career in France at Clou, a company that offers financial and leasing services to the shipping and transportation industry, before moving to San Francisco to run the American subsidiary of Compass Inc.

In 1985, he co-founded International SOS in Singapore with Pascal Rey-Herme.

Other roles

Arnaud Vaissié was the chairman of the French Chamber of Commerce in Great-Britain. He is the Chairman for the France-Singapore committee of MEDEF.

He is the chairman of the board of trustees of the Lycée International de Londres Winston Churchill and was a trustee in the creation of the Collège français bilingue de Londres.

He is on the board of directors of the Institut Montaigne. In 2004, he co-founded the think-tank, Le Cercle d'Outre-Manche (fr) with Pascal Boris.

Personal life

Arnaud Vaissié is married and currently lives in Paris. He has three children.

Awards

 Officer of the Legion of Honour (2022) 
 Officer of the National Order of Merit (2012)

References

French financial businesspeople
French healthcare chief executives
Living people
Chevaliers of the Légion d'honneur
Officers of the Ordre national du Mérite
1954 births
French company founders
21st-century French businesspeople
20th-century French businesspeople
Sciences Po alumni
Businesspeople from Paris